Lamellibrachia columna is a vestimentiferan tube worm from the South Pacific Ocean that has been shown to be very closely related genetically to Lamellibrachia satsuma found in Japanese waters.

References

Sabellida
Animals described in 1991
Fauna of the Pacific Ocean